Genoeconomics is an interdisciplinary field of protoscience that combines molecular genetics and economics.

Genoeconomics is based on the idea that economic indicators have a genetic basis — that a person's financial behaviour can be traced to their DNA and that genes are related to economic behaviour. As of 2015, the results have been inconclusive. Some minor correlations have been identified between genetics and economic preferences.

History 
The word genoeconomics was coined in 2007.

The field of economics and the economic indicators used by economists predate the Empiricist Age. Genoeconomics adds biological foundations to these traditional economic indicators.

Quantitative genetic data was not available to researchers until the year 2000, when the human genome was sequenced as part of the Human Genome Project. Genetic milestones of the late 20th and early 21st century, such as the sequencing of the human genome, has spurred interest in research combining economics and genetics.

Background 

Genoeconomics involves the study of single-nucleotide polymorphisms (SNPs). The field of genoeconomics uses genetic data to infer economic preferences such as time preference, risk aversion, and educational attainment, as well as macroeconomic data such as per-capita income. For example, genoeconomic methodology was used in a 2012 study of tobacco taxes in the United States, where such taxes vary across jurisdictions, to look at "the interaction of a single nicotinic receptor and state-level tobacco taxes to predict tobacco use". Additionally, genoeconomic research in 2013 found that two-fifths of the "variance of educational attainment is explained by genetic factors".

Some genoeconomic researchers claim that the economic success of a country can be predicted by its genetic diversity. The American economist Enrico Spolaore says that genoeconomic work could "reduce barriers to the flows of ideas and innovations across populations".

Criticism and limitations 

Genoeconomic research is prone to the public misconception that genetically-influenced behaviours are separate from environmental factors. The authors of a 2012 paper said that their work "is not about a nature or nurture debate".

Nature published an online article written in 2012 about the various reactions on the subject. The field is criticized by biologists for lacking methodological rigour, drawing conclusions about causation based on causal correlation, and working with small sample sizes. The political implications of the field are also a concern for some scientists; anticipating the publication of a genoeconomics article in the journal American Economic Review, a group of scientists and social scientists wrote an open letter which said that "the suggestion that an ideal level of genetic variation could foster economic growth and could even be engineered has the potential to be misused with frightening consequences to justify indefensible practices such as ethnic cleansing or genocide".

As with other genetic-association research, the reproducibility of genoeconomic experiments is troublesome to the field. The small sample sizes used in genoeconomic research are also a problem. Commonly cited by scientists as a way to improve genoeconomic research is the use of more statistically homogeneous samples.

References

Sources
 

 

 

 

 

 

 

 

 

 

Interdisciplinary subfields of economics
Molecular genetics
Behavioural genetics